Andrew Kober is an American stage and screen actor, best known for his role of Margaret Mead in the 2009 Broadway revival of Hair.

Early life 
Kober grew up in Shaker Heights, Ohio. His granduncle Arthur Kober was born to a Jewish family in Eastern Europe, before immigrating to the United States.

He studied at Carnegie Mellon University in Pittsburgh, Pennsylvania, graduating with a degree in Acting in 2006. He moved to New York City later in the year, and continues to reside there today.

Career

Theatre 
In 2008, Kober was cast in the Off-Broadway Revival of Hair, in the featured role of Margaret Mead. He stayed with the production in its 2009 transfer to Broadway, as well as its 2010 transfer to the West End.

Following Hair, Kober was cast in multiple small roles in the Second Broadway Revival of Les Misérables, and performed with the company until late 2015. After that, he was cast in the ensemble of the She Loves Me Broadway Revival, which had the distinction of being the first Broadway show to be live-streamed internationally online.

Kober also performed in regional productions of The 25th Annual Putnam County Spelling Bee, Ken Ludwig's Baskerville, National Pastime, Sense & Sensibility, and Spamalot.

Kober performed in a musical adaption of Twelfth Night from September 2–5, 2016 at the Delacorte Theatre.

In 2017, Kober appeared in the Broadway revival of Sunday in the Park with George and the Los Angeles premier of Roman Holiday. In October 2017, began performing on Broadway in the cast of School of Rock. Kober took a hiatus from School of Rock in summer 2018 in order to perform as Malvolio in a Shakespeare in the Park production of Twelfth Night. Following the show's closing, he returned to the cast of School of Rock.

Film and TV work 
Kober has also made multiple guest appearances on popular television shows, such as Boardwalk Empire, House of Cards, Blue Bloods, and Pan Am. He has been featured in the short film Chin Up, and can be seen in the filmed performance of She Loves Me.

Other work 
Kober is also a part of the comedy group, The (M)orons, along with three fellow Broadway actors and writers: Drew Gasparini, F. Michael Haynie, and Alex Brightman.

Personal life 
Kober is married to Farra Kober, the director of social media and community for MSNBC. They married in 2012, and have a son born in 2016.

Credits

New York and West End theatre

Filmography

References

Further reading
 
 
 

1984 births
Living people
American male stage actors
American male film actors
21st-century American male actors
Carnegie Mellon University alumni
Actors from Shaker Heights, Ohio